, also referred to as Hirose-jinja,  is a Shinto shrine located in Kawai, Nara prefecture, Japan.

The shrine became the object of Imperial patronage during the early Heian period.  In 965, Emperor Murakami ordered that Imperial messengers were sent to report important events to the guardian kami of Japan. These heihaku were initially presented to 16 shrines including the Hirose Shrine.

See also 
 List of Shinto shrines
 Twenty-Two Shrines
 Modern system of ranked Shinto Shrines

Notes

External links

References 
 Breen, John and Mark Teeuwen. (2000).  Shinto in History: Ways of the Kami. Honolulu: University of Hawaii Press. 
 Ponsonby-Fane, Richard. (1962).   Studies in Shinto and Shrines. Kyoto: Ponsonby Memorial Society. OCLC 399449
 ___. (1959).  The Imperial House of Japan. Kyoto: Ponsonby Memorial Society. OCLC 194887

Beppyo shrines
Kanpei-taisha
Shinto shrines in Nara Prefecture